Travis Partridge (born September 22, 1990) is an American football quarterback who is currently a free agent. He played college football at Missouri Western State University and attended Savannah High School in Savannah, Missouri. He has also been a member of the Minnesota Vikings, BC Lions, Hudson Valley Fort and Logan Wolverines.

College career
Partridge played for the Missouri Western Griffons from 2009 to 2013. He was the team's starter his final three years and helped the Griffons to 29 wins. He recorded career totals of 6,754 passing yards and 70 touchdowns on 1,561 completions. He also accumulated 1,561 rushing yards and 36 touchdowns on 410 rushing attempts.

Professional career

Minnesota Vikings
Partridge was signed by the Minnesota Vikings on May 11, 2014. He was released on May 19.

BC Lions
Partidge was signed by the BC Lions on May 28, 2014. He dressed for fourteen games during the 2014 season and saw limited action in short-yardage situations as the third-string quarterback. He scored his first CFL touchdown on a one-yard run against the Montreal Alouettes on July 19, 2014. Partidge took over for Kevin Glenn during the Eastern Semi-Final against the Montreal Alouettes, completing seven of eleven pass attempts for 38 yards and two touchdowns. He was released by the Lions June 14, 2015.

Hudson Valley Fort
Partridge joined the Hudson Valley Fort of the FXFL on September 28, 2015.

Logan Wolverines
Partridge was signed by the Logan Wolverines of the National Gridiron League on May 14, 2016.

Iowa Barnstormers
On May 23, 2016, Partridge signed with the Iowa Barnstormers of the Indoor Football League (IFL). Partridge re-signed with the Barnstormers for the 2017 season. He was named Second Team All-IFL and the IFL's Most Improved Player in 2017.

Coaching career

Early jobs
In 2017, Partridge spent the season as a graduate assistant Delta State, working primarily with the quarterbacks. While at Delta State, the Statesmen posted a 9-4 mark while finishing tied for second in the Gulf Coast Conference standings. Offensively, the squad averaged 30.1 points per game while scoring 50 offensive touchdowns.

UT Martin
In 2018, Partridge was hired as quarterbacks coach at UT Martin.

Kansas
On May 4, 2019, Partridge was hire as offensive quality control coach at the University of Kansas joining the staff of Les Miles.

Return to UT Martin
In January 2022, Partridge returned to UT Martin as the quarterbacks coach and pass game coordinator.

References

External links
BC Lions profile

Living people
1990 births
Players of American football from Missouri
American football quarterbacks
Canadian football quarterbacks
American players of Canadian football
Missouri Western Griffons football players
Minnesota Vikings players
BC Lions players
Hudson Valley Fort players
Iowa Barnstormers players
Sportspeople from St. Joseph, Missouri